Richard Pilling (11 August 1855 – 28 March 1891) was an English professional cricketer who played for Lancashire County Cricket Club from 1877 to 1889, and in eight Test matches for England from 1881 to 1888. He was born at Old Warden, Bedfordshire, and died at Old Trafford, Manchester.

Pilling was a wicket-keeper who completed 459 catches and 208 stumpings in 250 first-class matches. As a right-handed batsman, he scored 2,572 career runs at an average of 9.85 runs per completed innings with a highest score of 78 as one of two half-centuries.

Early years
Pilling was born on 11 August 1855 in Old Warden, Bedfordshire, and his parents, John and Ann Pilling, relocated to Church, Lancashire when he was a little child. His brother William (1857–1924) was born at Church. Pilling became a stonemason and played cricket in his spare time for Church Cricket Club.

Career
Pilling made his debut for Lancashire County Cricket Club in a three-day match against Sussex County Cricket Club in August 1877, soon before his 22nd birthday. He played as the Lancashire wicket-keeper and was number 11 in the batting order. Lancashire won the match by an innings and 31 runs. They batted first and scored 345. Pilling was run out for 2. Sussex, struggling against the pace attack of Alec Watson and William McIntyre were all out for 241 and, having followed on, 73. Pilling's first dismissal was James Phillips, whom he stumped for 8 off Watson's bowling. In the second innings, he caught Phillips and stumped Richard Fillery, both off Watson.

In the 1891 edition of Wisden Cricketers' Almanack, Pilling was selected as one of "Five Great Wicket-keepers". In his obituary the following year, Wisden called Pilling "the greatest English wicket-keeper of his day (whose) only superior was Jack Blackham (of Australia)".

Style and technique
According to The Morning Post's obituary, Pilling's only superior wicket-keeper was Blackham. The publication remarked on Pilling's precise approach and stated that he was not just bright but also a safe pair of hands, achieving his goals without fanfare or display.

Illness and death
Pilling's career ended in 1889 because illness prevented him from playing in 1890. It is understood that his health was always delicate but, in the winter of 1889–90, things took a turn for the worse when he had a severe attack of pneumonia, causing a lung inflammation that developed into tuberculosis (then called consumption). In the autumn of 1890, he sailed to Australia in the vain hope that a change of climate would help him. It did not and he sailed home again, arriving on 22 March 1891. Family and friends could see that his condition was beyond recovery and he died only six days later on 28 March. The cause of death was primarily consumption but he also had oedema (then called dropsy). The Morning Post said: "Modest and unassuming in manner, Pilling was among the most popular cricketers of his day".

References

1855 births
1891 deaths
England Test cricketers
English cricketers of 1864 to 1889
English cricketers
Lancashire cricketers
Marylebone Cricket Club cricketers
North v South cricketers
People from Bedfordshire
Players cricketers
Wicket-keepers
Wisden Cricketers of the Year